Andrea Chiopris Gori (born 17 December 1977) is an Italian former footballer who played as a midfielder. He played his last professional championship for Serie C2 team Unione Sportiva Poggibonsi. In 2012, he closed his career in the Italian amateur team Lanciotto Campi Bisenzio.

See also
Football in Italy
List of football clubs in Italy

References

External links
 Andrea Chiopris Gori's profile on San Marino Calcio's official website

1977 births
Italian footballers
Living people
A.S.D. Victor San Marino players
Bassano Virtus 55 S.T. players
Association football midfielders
A.C. Prato players
F.C. Südtirol players